Daniel Neaga (born November 5, 1965 in Botoroaga) is a former Romanian rugby union football player and currently a coach. He played as a scrum-half.

Coaching career
After retiring from playing Daniel Neaga coached Romanian rugby clubs Dinamo București and Olimpia București. In the present time, Daniel Neaga is coaching in a town near Bucharest, at the A.C.S.O.V Pantelimon.

International career
Daniel Neaga gathered 41 caps for Romania, from his debut in 1988 to his last game in 1996. He scored 4 tries during his international career, 19 points on aggregate. He was a member of his national side for the 2nd and 3rd Rugby World Cups in 1991 and 1995 and played in 4 group matches.

References

External links

1965 births
Living people
Romanian rugby union players
Romanian rugby union coaches
Romania international rugby union players
Rugby union scrum-halves
People from Teleorman County